Pogonotium was a dioecious genus of flowering plant in the palm family found in Malaysia and Borneo. Its species are now included within the genus Calamus. Its close relatives are climbing rattans and while partially armed with climbing apparatus, its habit is sprawling and leaning but not effective climbing.  The reduced inflorescence nestled between the auricles is unusual and distinguishes it from similar relatives like Calamus, Daemonorops and Ceratolobus.  The name is Greek meaning "bearded".

Description

The trunks are both solitary and clustering with short internodes, usually covered in spiny, persistent leaf sheaths.  The pinnate leaf has a tubular sheath with whorls and scatters of spines and hairy, brown tomentum, the sheath ending in a narrow, armed auricle on each side of the petiole.  The petiole is abaxially rounded, adaxially flattened, hairy, and equipped with grapnel spines.  The rachis is similarly armed, the leaflets widely spaced to crowded, linear, with one fold, and covered in bristles and scales; the midrib is adaxially prominent, the transverse veinlets are short yet conspicuous.

The inflorescence, though axillary, is adnate to the internode and sheath of the following leaf, emerging erect between the auricles of the subtending leaf.  In pistillate members it is branched to two orders, staminate to three; in both, a boat shaped, beak-ended prophyll encloses it.  The prophyll may or may nor be armed and eventually develops a longitudinal split, exposing the flowers.  The rachis bracts are small with free tips, the bracts on the first-order branches are tubular towards the base with triangular limbs.

The staminate flowers are solitary borne, on second and third order branches, subtended by a tiny, tubular, triangular bract and a two keeled bracteole.  The tubular calyx is proximally striate, divided into three triangular lobes; the corolla is divided nearly to the base into three lobes. The six stamen are borne at the base of the corolla with fleshy, elongated filaments, inflexed at the tip, with oblong, medifixed anthers.  The pollen is elliptic, diporate with rugulate to reticulate, tectate exine.

The larger pistillate flowers are borne in dyads, similarly subtended by a triangular bract, and accompanied by a sterile staminate flower and two, two keeled bracteoles.  The sterile staminate flower is similar to the fertile but is slightly contorted with empty anthers.  The pistillate has a striate, cup shaped calyx with triangular, valvate lobes, and the corolla splits to the base into similar triangular segments.  There are six epipetalous staminodes, with triocular, triovulate, scaly, ovoid gynoecium and three fleshy, divergent, rugose stigmas, attached at the base.  The fruit is globose or ovoid, beaked, with apical stigmatic remains and covered in vertical rows or magenta to brown scales.  The single seed has a basal embryo, a thick sarcotesta and a sweet, homogeneous endosperm.

Distribution and habitat
These are a tropical plant, P. divaricatum and P. moorei are sometimes found high on Bornean ridge tops from 700 to 1000 m in podsolized soils or in heath forests called "kerangas".  P. ursinum is confined to the Malaysian peninsula.

References

External links
GBIF portal
Fairchild Guide to Palms: Pogonotium

Calamoideae
Dioecious plants
Arecaceae genera